This is a list of football (soccer) clubs in North Macedonia.

First level

There are total of 10 clubs in the top tier of the football in North Macedonia.

Second level

There are a total of 20 clubs in two divisions when it comes to the second tier of the football in North Macedonia.

East

West

Third level

There are a total of 71 clubs in five leagues when it comes to the third tier of the football in North Macedonia.

East

Center

South

North

West

Southwest

Other active notable clubs

Bashkimi 1947
Ljuboten
Milano Kumanovo
Poeshevo
Rrufeja
Slavija

Defunct
11 Oktomvri (inactive)
Aerodrom
Albarsa
Alumina (inactive)
Astibo (inactive)
Babi (inactive)
Balkan Skopje
Bashkimi
Belo Brdo
Bregalnica Delchevo
Butel (inactive)
Gragjanski Skopje (Makedonija Skopje)
Ilinden Velmej (inactive)
Korzo
Kumanovo (inactive)
Ljubanci (inactive)
Lozar
Jugohrom (inactive)
Metalurg Skopje (inactive)
Metalurg Veles
Miravci (inactive)
Mladost Carev Dvor (inactive)
Nov Milenium
Ohrid Lote
Pobeda (suspended)
Pobeda Skopje
Rabotnik Dzhumajlija (inactive)
Udarnik Pirava
Vardarski (inactive)
Varosh (inactive)
Shkëndija Arachinovo (inactive)
Sloga Jugomagnat
Treska
Tri Cheshmi

External links
Address Book of the clubs at FFM website 

North Macedonia
clubs
 
Football clubs